Shrule Abbey is a former monastery and National Monument located in County Mayo, Ireland.

Location
Shrule Abbey is located to the southwest of Shrule village, north of the Black River and south of St. Colman's Church.

History
According to tradition, Christianity was brought to Shrule by Saint Patrick himself in the 5th century AD. He founded a church at Donaghpatrick and left a disciple, Felartus, in charge. The ancient abbey of Cloghvanaha (Irish for "blessed stone") is believed to have grown from this site.

Shrule was formerly under the jurisdiction of Cong Abbey, then in 1152 it was placed under Annaghdown Abbey. The abbey was replaced by St. Colman's Church (Teampall Cholmain) c. 1200 as the main place of worship in Shrule. Clogvanaha is mentioned in the ecclesiastical taxation of 1306.

Building
Little remains of this ancient abbey: only a rectangular mound (11 × 13.4 m; 12 × 14.7 yd)  with masonry rubble visible in places.

References

Christian monasteries in the Republic of Ireland
Religion in County Mayo
Archaeological sites in County Mayo
National Monuments in County Mayo